Little Nellie Kelly is a 1940 American musical-comedy film based on the stage musical of the same title by George M. Cohan which was a hit on Broadway in 1922 and 1923.  The film was written by Jack McGowan and directed by Norman Taurog. Its cast included Judy Garland, George Murphy, Charles Winninger and Douglas McPhail.

The film is notable for containing Judy Garland's only on-screen death scene, but she re-appears in the film as the daughter of the character who died.

Plot
In Ireland, Jerry Kelly (George Murphy) marries his sweetheart Nellie Noonan (Judy Garland) over the objections of her ne'er-do-well father Michael Noonan (Charles Winninger), who swears never to speak to Jerry again, even though he reluctantly accompanies the newlyweds to the U.S., where Jerry becomes a policeman, and all three become citizens. Michael continues to hold his grudge against Jerry, even when Nellie dies shortly after giving birth to her daughter, also named Nellie.

Years later, Jerry is now a captain on the police force, and little Nellie (also played by Judy Garland) has grown up as the spitting image of her mother. Michael dotes on his granddaughter but is embarrassed when she sings in public at the police department parade (It's a Great Day for the Irish). He uses a supposed weak heart, for which he takes a tot of whiskey from a medicine bottle, to get his way with little Nellie and to avoid work. When Nellie becomes enamored of Dennis Fogarty (Douglas McPhail), the son of Michael's old friend Timothy Fogarty (Arthur Shields), the conflict in the home intensifies. Jerry is happy for her, but Michael objects to the romance, and when Nellie, encouraged by her father, finally stands up to him,  he leaves home.

Eventually, the three generations are reconciled, and Nellie and Dennis remain a couple.

Cast
 Judy Garland as Nellie Noonan Kelly and as Little Nellie Kelly
 George Murphy as Jerry Kelly
 Charles Winninger as Michael "Mike" Noonan
 Douglas McPhail as Dennis Fogarty
 Arthur Shields as Timothy Fogarty
 Rita Page as Mrs. Mary Fogarty
 Forrester Harvey as Moriarity
 James Burke as Police Sergeant McGowan
 George Watts as Mr. Keevan, NYC Bar Owner

Songs
Judy Garland sings a swing version of "Singin' in the Rain" more than 10 years before Gene Kelly famously sang it in his film Singin' in the Rain (1952) as well as sings several newer songs, including the traditional "A Pretty Girl Milking Her Cow" sung partly in Irish-Gaelic. There are also two production numbers, one set at the New York City Policeman's Ball and the other written by Roger Edens. In the latter, Garland sings "It's A Great Day for the Irish" while marching in New York City's St. Patrick's Day Parade. This song became one of Garland's bigger hits.

Songs cut from the film include "Rings on Your Fingers and Bells on Your Toes" (used in Garland's later film Babes on Broadway, 1941), "Danny Boy" and "How Can You Buy Killarney".

Production
After the success of The Wizard of Oz (1939), the film was a "test" by MGM to evaluate both Garland's audience appeal and her physical image. It was rumored at the time that George M Cohan sold the rights expressly as a vehicle for Garland. The film gave 18-year-old Garland the opportunity to grow up as she is in the first half of the picture set in Ireland, in which she plays Nellie Noonan, the mother of Little Nellie Kelly. Although called "a bit of Blarney", overall the film was well-received. Critics noted Garland "gets prettier with each picture".

Box office
According to MGM records, the film earned $968,000 in the U.S. and Canada and $1,078,000 in other markets, resulting in a profit of $680,000.

Home media
The film was released on DVD on March 15, 2011.

See also
 List of Films Set in Ireland

Notes

External links

 
 
 
 
 Little Nellie Kelly at the Judy Garland Online Discography
 Irish in Film

1940 films
1940 musical comedy films
1940 romantic comedy films
American black-and-white films
American musical comedy films
American romantic comedy films
American romantic musical films
1940s English-language films
Fictional portrayals of the New York City Police Department
Films about Irish-American culture
Films about the New York City Police Department
Films based on musicals
Films based on works by George M. Cohan
Films directed by Norman Taurog
Films produced by Arthur Freed
Films set in Ireland
Films set in New York City
Metro-Goldwyn-Mayer films
1940s American films